The 1983–84 season was the 60th season in the existence of AEK Athens F.C. and the 25th consecutive season in the top flight of Greek football. They competed in the Alpha Ethniki, the Greek Cup and the European Cup Winners' Cup. The season began on 4 September 1983 and finished on 6 May 1984.

Overview

In the summer of 1983, AEK faced another administrative change in their presidency. Michalis Arkadis left the wheel of the team and despite having won the cup last year, he did not have the financial means to lift the burden of their obligations and mostly importantly the completion of the eight-year contract of Thomas Mavros. The Cypriot businessman, Lefteris Panagidis stepped in and kept Mavros in the team by giving him the amount of 45 million drachmas, while he replaced Arkadis in the presidency of the team. His direct collaborators were Dimitris Roussakis and Michalis Lefakis. The new president, although having a travel agency in Athens, he maintained his headquarters in England. That was the reason for his admiration of the English football model, which through his choices he tried to pass on to the club. So, for the team's bench, he hired the British John Barnwell, who as the coach of Wolves had won the League Cup and looked ideal. British footballers Trevor Ross, from Everton and Tommy Langley, from Crystal Palace, came with him to the team in an atmosphere of excitement and high expectations. AEK also proceeded with the acquisition of the Greek-Brazilian Pavlos Papaioannou from Rodos, as well as the promising midfielder of Veria, Babis Akrivopoulos. On the other hand, Mojaš Radonjić left the team and returned to Yugoslavia, after being disappointed and failed to live up to the expectations.

The team begun with dreams and excitement, but landed abruptly in reality and had one of the worst seasons in their history. The club started badly, paid mainly for their inability to respond to the away games. Eventually the coach was fired after a home defeat by Iraklis in the 12th matchday, having already been eliminated at the same time from the Cup Winners' Cup at the first round by Újpest, counting 4 defeats, 2 draws and no wins away from home. The British coach was succeeded by the "old acquaintance" Austrian Helmut Senekowitsch at first and later by Kostas Nestoridis, who completed the tragic course of the championship as AEK Athens' coach. Eventually the team finished at 7th place, 16 points behind Panathinaikos, who won the title. AEK were eliminated from the Greek Cup and from the opportunity to defend the title, at the round of 16 by the later finalist, AEL. In the few notable things of the season were the 4–0 victory over PAOK, the performance of Thomas Mavros with 13 goals in 21 appearances and the performance of Vangelis Vlachos, who showed that AEK could rely and build on him.

Players

Squad information

NOTE: The players are the ones that have been announced by the AEK Athens' press release. No edits should be made unless a player arrival or exit is announced. Updated 30 June 1984, 23:59 UTC+3.

Transfers

In

Summer

Notes

 a.  Plus a conduction of a friendly match between the two clubs.

Winter

Out

Summer

Winter

Loan out

Summer

Renewals

Overall transfer activity

Expenditure
Summer:  ₯75,000,000

Winter:  ₯0

Total:  ₯75,000,000

Income
Summer:  ₯0

Winter:  ₯0

Total:  ₯0

Net Totals
Summer:  ₯75,000,000

Winter:  ₯0

Total:  ₯75,000,000

Pre-season and friendlies

Alpha Ethniki

League table

Results summary

Results by Matchday

Fixtures

Greek Cup

Matches

Round of 32

Round of 16

European Cup Winners' Cup

First round

Statistics

Squad statistics

! colspan="11" style="background:#FFDE00; text-align:center" | Goalkeepers
|-

! colspan="11" style="background:#FFDE00; color:black; text-align:center;"| Defenders
|-

! colspan="11" style="background:#FFDE00; color:black; text-align:center;"| Midfielders
|-

! colspan="11" style="background:#FFDE00; color:black; text-align:center;"| Forwards
|-

! colspan="11" style="background:#FFDE00; color:black; text-align:center;"| Left during Winter Transfer Window
|-

|}

Disciplinary record

|-
! colspan="17" style="background:#FFDE00; text-align:center" | Goalkeepers

|-
! colspan="17" style="background:#FFDE00; color:black; text-align:center;"| Defenders

|-
! colspan="17" style="background:#FFDE00; color:black; text-align:center;"| Midfielders

|-
! colspan="17" style="background:#FFDE00; color:black; text-align:center;"| Forwards

|-
! colspan="17" style="background:#FFDE00; color:black; text-align:center;"| Left during Winter Transfer Window

|}

References

External links
AEK Athens F.C. Official Website

AEK Athens F.C. seasons
AEK Athens